Wzdów  is a village in the administrative district of Gmina Haczów, within Brzozów County, Subcarpathian Voivodeship, in south-eastern Poland. The village has a population of 1,000. The palace at Wzdów was the seat the Polish noble family of Ostoja-Ostaszewski. After the expropriation of landlords in Poland by the communist regime in 1944/1945, the palace fell into ruin.

References

 The Ostoja-Ostaszewski Palace. Documentary film by TVP (public Polish TV channel)

Villages in Brzozów County
Palaces in Poland